Spencer is a city in and the county seat of Roane County, West Virginia, United States. Originally known as "California," Spencer was chartered in 1858, and named after Spencer Roane (1762–1822), a distinguished jurist from Virginia, who served on the Virginia Supreme Court of Appeals, and for whom Roane County was named.  The population was 2,062 at the 2020 census.  Spencer is the home of the annual West Virginia Black Walnut Festival. Points of interest include Charles Fork Lake, Chrystal Water and Power Company-Spencer Water and Ice Company, the McIntosh Mansion, and the Robey Theatre.

Geography
Spencer is located at  (38.801690, -81.351689).  Spring Creek flows through the city.

Climate
The climate in this area is characterized by hot, humid summers and generally mild to cool winters.  According to the Köppen Climate Classification system, Spencer has a humid subtropical climate, abbreviated "Cfa" on climate maps.

Demographics

2010 census
As of the census of 2010, there were 2,322 people, 1,005 households, and 578 families living in the city. The racial makeup of the city was 97.5% White, 0.1% Native American, 0.3% Asian, 0.6% from other races, and 1.5% from two or more races. Hispanic or Latino of any race were 1.7% of the population.

There were 1,005 households, of which 28.3% had children under the age of 18 living with them, 38.5% were married couples living together, 13.6% had a female householder with no husband present, 5.4% had a male householder with no wife present, and 42.5% were non-families. 37.6% of all households were made up of individuals, and 17.7% had someone living alone who was 65 years of age or older. The average household size was 2.25 and the average family size was 2.94.

The median age in the city was 40.2 years. 23.2% of residents were under the age of 18; 8.5% were between the ages of 18 and 24; 23.5% were from 25 to 44; 26.3% were from 45 to 64; and 18.5% were 65 years of age or older. The gender makeup of the city was 46.7% male and 53.3% female.

2000 census
As of the census of 2000, there were 2,352 people, 1,005 households, and 614 families living in the city. The population density was 1,984.3 people per square mile (763.1/km2). There were 1,154 housing units at an average density of 973.6 per square mile (374.4/km2). The racial makeup of the city was 97.62% White, 0.13% African American, 0.21% Native American, 0.68% Asian, 0.04% from other races, and 1.32% from two or more races. Hispanic or Latino of any race were 0.77% of the population.

There were 1,005 households, out of which 27.6% had children under the age of 18 living with them, 44.2% were married couples living together, 12.9% had a female householder with no husband present, and 38.9% were non-families. 35.0% of all households were made up of individuals, and 19.8% had someone living alone who was 65 years of age or older. The average household size was 2.25 and the average family size was 2.89.

In the city, the population was spread out, with 23.9% under the age of 18, 8.3% from 18 to 24, 23.6% from 25 to 44, 22.1% from 45 to 64, and 22.2% who were 65 years of age or older. The median age was 41 years. For every 100 females there were 86.1 males. For every 100 females age 18 and over, there were 80.6 males.

The median income for a household in the city was $19,773, and the median income for a family was $28,500. Males had a median income of $28,000 versus $16,452 for females. The per capita income for the city was $12,976. About 24.9% of families and 31.0% of the population were below the poverty line, including 42.8% of those under age 18 and 21.4% of those age 65 or over.

Notable people
 Ruby Bradley, Colonel, U.S. Army, 1907–2002
 Derek Hardman, Offensive tackle for the National Football League's Detroit Lions
 Deborah Hersman, Chairperson, National Transportation Safety Board from 2009 to 2014
Larry Starcher, retired Justice of the West Virginia Supreme Court

Media

Radio
 WYRC-LP, Grade School (K-12) - 92.3 FM
 WVRC-FM, Country - 104.7 FM
 WMCC-LP, Religious (3ABN Radio) - 105.7 FM
 WVRC-AM, Gospel Music - 1400 AM

References

External links
 City website

Cities in Roane County, West Virginia
County seats in West Virginia